Toby William Lloyd Rand (born 21 December 1977) is an Australian singer best known for being lead singer of rock band RAND, previous band Juke Kartel, and his appearance on Rock Star: Supernova. Currently, he fronts solo project Toby Rand & The FutureKind, and a lead role in the theater production ROCKTOPIA.

Early life and family
Rand was born in Melbourne.  His mother is from north Wales and is fluent in the Welsh language; his father is from England. Toby has two brothers, Simon and Tim. Both were a driving inspiration for him to become a singer/musician. Toby grew up in Bayside Melbourne, Australia. Toby has a daughter named London Ava, who was born in 2010.

Singing career

Toby Rand & The FutureKind will debut their release mid-2019. Working with major producer Alex Geringas, the record is set to push the boundaries of the electronic / rock culture.
Rand's previous band ‘Juke Kartel’ toured the United States as a support act for Slash, Ozzy Osbourne, Fuel, Rock Star: Supernova and opened for Nickelback and Seether during their Australia tours. Tours have also included Scandinavia, Canada and Australasia. Juke Kartel have also performed at several music festivals in Australia and many music award shows, including winning 2 awards at the MusicOz awards. Juke Kartel released Levolution in 2010/11.

Toby Rand was also a finalist in Cleo's Australian Bachelor of the Year 2008. He is one of the characters in the book Sex Tips from Rock Stars by Paul Miles, published by Omnibus Press in July 2010.

Rand is currently signed to The Rejected Group production team. Also in the works is new music with INXS bassist Garry Beers set for release later in 2019.

References

External links
www.tobyrand.com

www.facebook.com/tobyrandmusic

@tobyrand

1977 births
Musicians from Melbourne
Rockstar: Supernova contestants
Living people
Australian singer-songwriters
21st-century Australian singers
21st-century Australian male singers
Australian male singer-songwriters